Refuge du Saut is a refuge of Savoie, France. It lies in the Massif de la Vanoise range, between Les Menuires and the La Masse peak.
It is on the Lou skiing itineraire.

Mountain huts in the Alps
Mountain huts in France